Pichakkana Wongsarattanasin (born 30 August 1991) nicknamed Namtarn (น้ำตาล) is a Thai actress and model. Known as a Net idol and for a leading role in MajjuratSiNamPhueng in 2013, her dramatic debut.

Early life 
Pichukkana was born in Phrae province. Her father was a police officer. Her mother is also a civil servant, and she has a brother who is 6 years younger.

Pichakkana graduated from high school from Muang Khai Pittayakom School, Phrae province. During that time she wrote part of a novel, but stopped before finishing it. After finishing secondary school, Pichukkana studied at the Faculty of Education at Chiang Mai University because she wanted to be a teacher, according to her parents, who were civil servants.

As a first year student, she was a cheerleader and won many beauty-related awards, including the public's favorite award in the Miss CMU League contest, Nitipon Clinic's clear-faced girl award, and Puriku Idol award. Her future personal manager invited her to do photoshoots and TV commercials.

Career 
In 2012, she signed a contract as an actress under Channel 3 and in the same year, Arunocha Panupan, the drama producer of Channel 3 as an executive of Broadcast Thai Television Company, chose her to play Rojanachanai, the heroine in the TV series MajjuratSiNamPhueng, instead of Taksaorn Paksukcharern. To pursue her acting career, Pichukkana resigned from Chiang Mai University to study at the Department of Communication Arts Faculty of Management Science Suan Sunandha Rajabhat University. Due to insufficient study time, she moved to the field of film and video science College of Communication Arts Rangsit University in the middle of 2013.

References 

1991 births
Pichukkana Wongsarattanasin
Living people